is the thirty-first single by Japanese musical artist Gackt, released on June 10, 2009. This single was the first of four singles of the countdown to Gackt's 10th anniversary as a solo artist. This single was titled The 1st Heaven. Each of the countdown singles were scheduled to be released within a week of each other.

The second song on the single, "My Father's Day" was written in memory of Gackt's Fūrin Kazan co-actor and close friend, Ken Ogata.

Record jacket
On its record jacket, "Koakuma Heaven" features a total of 15 female models, such as Sayaka Araki and Sayo Hayakawa, who have appeared in the popular gyaru magazine Koakuma Ageha. The fanclub-only version of the jacket features Gackt dressed as a woman.

Tracklist

Charts

References

2009 singles
Gackt songs
2009 songs
Songs written by Gackt